La Centinela is an archaeological site in Peru which was an active administrative center during both the Inca and pre-Inca periods.

History
La Centinela was the Incan capital of the kingdom of the Chincha.  It is "an unusual site in that it is one of the very few places where the Incas incorporated a major state installation into a preexisting, and still functioning, non-Inca capital."  In 1958, Dwight T. Wallace discovered a system of straight roads emanating from La Centinela, suggesting a highly centralized pre-Incan administration.

Site
La Centinela lies about 200 km south of Lima in the Chincha Valley and about 1 km away from the Pacific Ocean and is surrounded by irrigated agricultural land.  This means that the residents of La Centinela exploited plant, animal and marine resources.

There are 11 well-defined pyramid structures and minor buildings constructed by adobe bricks.  There are examples of adobe walls decorated using the technique of Champlevé.

A black and red on white geometric painting can be found within the principal Inca building.

Notes

Archaeological sites in Peru
Archaeological sites in Ica Region